Wiesau is a municipality in Bavaria, Germany.

Wiesau may also refer to:

Wiesau (river), a river of Bavaria, Germany
Radwanice, Polkowice County, a village in Poland, (German name Wiesau)
Łączna, Kłodzko County, a village in Poland, (German name Wiesau)